The 1956 Nova Scotia general election was held on 30 October 1956 to elect members of the 46th House of Assembly of the Province of Nova Scotia, Canada. It was won by the Progressive Conservatives led by Robert Stanfield. 

This was the first election the Liberals had fought after the death of their longtime charismatic leader, Angus L. Macdonald. Public Health Minister Harold Connolly became interim leader and premier following Macdonald's death in 1954, but was defeated at a leadership convention by Education Minister Henry Hicks. The convention exposed a sharp religious divide in the Liberal Party; Hicks was a Protestant and Connolly was a Catholic. Hicks was unable to heal the breach, and the Liberals were narrowly defeated, ending 23 years of Liberal rule.

Results

Results by party

Retiring incumbents
Liberal
Arthur W. MacKenzie, Guysborough
James Edward Rutledge, Halifax Centre

Nominated candidates
Legend
bold denotes party leader
† denotes an incumbent who is not running for re-election or was defeated in nomination contest

Valley

|-
|bgcolor=whitesmoke|Annapolis East
||
|Henry Hicks2,83054.68%
|
|Harry L. Ritcey2,27743.99%
|
|Murray Alton Bent691.33%
|
|
||
|Henry HicksAnnapolis
|-
|bgcolor=whitesmoke|Annapolis West
||
|Peter M. Nicholson2,52353.84%
|
|Leigh Minard Marshall2,16346.16%
|
|
|
|
||
|New riding
|-
|bgcolor=whitesmoke|Clare
||
|Pierre E. Belliveau2,04652.60%
|
|J. Fred Gaudet1,84447.40%
|
|
|
|
||
|Pierre E. Belliveau
|-
|bgcolor=whitesmoke|Digby
|
|Victor Cardoza2,55948.65%
||
|Malcolm Stewart Leonard2,70151.35%
|
|
|
|
||
|Victor Cardoza
|-
|bgcolor=whitesmoke|Hants West
|
|Gerald Regan3,30047.69%
||
|George Henry Wilson3,40549.21%
|
|Ralph Loomer2143.09%
|
|
||
|George Henry Wilson
|-
|bgcolor=whitesmoke|Kings North
||
|Eric Balcom3,05450.37%
|
|George Arthur Boggs3,00949.63%
|
|
|
|
||
|George Arthur BoggsKings
|-
|bgcolor=whitesmoke|Kings South
|
|MacIntosh MacLeod1,59440.23%
||
|Edward Haliburton2,36859.77%
|
|
|
|
||
|Edward HaliburtonKings
|-
|bgcolor=whitesmoke|Kings West
|
|C.D. McLean2,98549.97%
||
|Hiram Thomas2,98850.03%
|
|
|
|
||
|New riding
|}

South Shore

|-
|bgcolor=whitesmoke|Lunenburg Centre
|
|Harold Uhlman3,84349.03%
||
|George O. Lohnes3,99550.97%
|
|
|
|
||
|New riding
|-
|bgcolor=whitesmoke|Lunenburg East
|
|Kirk S. Hennigar1,57945.56%
||
|R. Clifford Levy1,88754.44%
|
|
|
|
||
|R. Clifford LevyLunenburg
|-
|bgcolor=whitesmoke|Lunenburg West
|
|Frederick E.L. Fowke2,50049.34%
||
|Harley J. Spence2,56750.66%
|
|
|
|
||
|Harley J. SpenceLunenburg
|-
|bgcolor=whitesmoke|Queens
|
|Merrill D. Rawding2,97449.23%
||
|W. S. Kennedy Jones3,06750.77%
|
|
|
|
||
|W. S. Kennedy Jones
|-
|bgcolor=whitesmoke|Shelburne
|
|Wilfred Dauphinee3,08648.05%
||
|James McKay Harding3,33751.95%
|
|
|
|
||
|Wilfred Dauphinee
|-
|rowspan=2 bgcolor=whitesmoke|Yarmouth 
||
|Eric Spinney4,87626.68%
|
|William Heartz Brown4,00721.93%
|
|
|
|
||
|William Heartz Brown
|-
||
|Willard O'Brien5,43829.76%
|
|Raymond Z. Bourque3,95321.63%
|
|
|
|
||
|Raymond Z. Bourque
|}

Fundy-Northeast

|-
|rowspan=2 bgcolor=whitesmoke|Colchester
|
|Hector Hill6,73322.13%
||
|Robert Stanfield8,47627.86%
|
|Arnold Lynds2510.83%
|
|
||
|Robert Stanfield
|-
|
|Margaret Norrie6,66421.91%
||
|George Isaac Smith8,05726.48%
|
|William Wright2400.79%
|
|
||
|George Isaac Smith
|-
|bgcolor=whitesmoke|Cumberland Centre
|
|Ralph F. Gilroy1,80339.70%
||
|Stephen T. Pyke2,73860.30%
|
|
|
|
||
|Stephen T. Pyke
|-
|bgcolor=whitesmoke|Cumberland East
|
|Walter Tremaine Purdy4,30349.41%
||
|James A. Langille4,40650.59%
|
|
|
|
||
|James A. Langille
|-
|bgcolor=whitesmoke|Cumberland West
||
|Allison T. Smith2,61854.82%
|
|William Harmon Wasson2,15845.18%
|
|
|
|
||
|Allison T. Smith
|-
|bgcolor=whitesmoke|Hants East
|
|Arthur W. MacKenzie2,34248.91%
||
|Ernest M. Ettinger2,39249.96%
|
|Malcolm F. Wheadon1301.13%
|
|
||
|Vacant
|}

Halifax/Dartmouth/Eastern Shore

|-
|bgcolor=whitesmoke|Halifax Centre
||
|Gordon S. Cowan5,64252.91%
|
|David Milsom5,02247.09%
|
|
|
|
||
|James Edward Rutledge† 
|-
|bgcolor=whitesmoke|Halifax County-Dartmouth
||
|Geoffrey W. Stevens7,27649.69%
|
|C.J. Creighton6,81146.51%
|
|Gerald Yetman5573.80%
|
|
||
|New riding
|-
|bgcolor=whitesmoke|Halifax East
||
|Duncan MacMillan3,01557.84%
|
|Reid Denton Sangster2,19842.16%
|
|
|
|
||
|Geoffrey W. Stevens
|-
|bgcolor=whitesmoke|Halifax North
||
|John E. Ahern8,77353.10%
|
|John A. O'Malley7,74846.90%
|
|
|
|
||
|Vacant
|-
|bgcolor=whitesmoke|Halifax Northwest
||
|Ronald Manning Fielding3,76350.40%
|
|S.E. Haverstock3,57347.86%
|
|L.C. Wilson1301.74%
|
|
||
|New riding
|-
|bgcolor=whitesmoke|Halifax South
|
|Edward F. Cragg5,17146.08%
||
|Richard Donahoe6,05153.92%
|
|
|
|
||
|Richard Donahoe
|-
|bgcolor=whitesmoke|Halifax West
||
|Charles H. Reardon6,11951.02%
|
|William J. Dalton5,87548.98%
|
|
|
|
||
|Ronald Manning Fielding
|}

Central Nova

|-
|bgcolor=whitesmoke|Antigonish 
|
|Colin H. Chisholm2,66948.06%
||
|William F. MacKinnon2,88451.94%
|
|
|
|
||
|Colin H. Chisholm
|-
|bgcolor=whitesmoke|Guysborough
||
|Alexander W. Cameron3,17751.34%
|
|R.S. Kaiser3,01148.66%
|
|
|
|
||
|Arthur W. MacKenzie†
|-
|bgcolor=whitesmoke|Pictou Centre
|
|A.T. Logan5,30348.46%
||
|Donald R. MacLeod5,63951.54%
|
|
|
|
||
|Vacant
|-
|bgcolor=whitesmoke|Pictou East
|
|John W. MacDonald2,74949.95%
||
|William A. MacLeod2,75450.05%
|
|
|
|
||
|John W. MacDonald
|-
|bgcolor=whitesmoke|Pictou West
|
|Stewart W. Proudfoot2,55649.15%
||
|Harvey Veniot2,64450.85%
|
|
|
|
||
|Stewart W. Proudfoot
|}

Cape Breton

|-
|bgcolor=whitesmoke|Cape Breton Centre
|
|James P. McNeil2,56937.75%
|
|Charles P. Miller1,28918.94%
||
|Michael James MacDonald2,94843.31%
|
|
||
|Michael James MacDonald
|-
|bgcolor=whitesmoke|Cape Breton East
|
|C. Roy MacDonald3,05829.85%
||
|Layton Fergusson4,32442.20%
|
|Russell Cunningham2,86427.95%
|
|
||
|Russell Cunningham
|-
|bgcolor=whitesmoke|Cape Breton North
|
|Alexander O'Handley4,46542.31%
||
|John Michael Macdonald6,08857.69%
|
|
|
|
||
|Alexander O'Handley
|-
|bgcolor=whitesmoke|Cape Breton Nova
|
|Gus Brown1,68225.68%
||
|Percy Gaum2,58239.41%
|
|John A. Chisholm1,47522.52%
|
|Charles O'Connell81212.40%
||
|New riding
|-
|bgcolor=whitesmoke|Cape Breton South
|
|John Smith MacIvor4,45041.66%
||
|Donald C. MacNeil5,10147.76%
|
|Albert Martin1,13010.58%
|
|
||
|John Smith MacIvor
|-
|bgcolor=whitesmoke|Cape Breton West
|
|Malcolm A. Patterson4,10448.03%
||
|Edward Manson4,44051.97%
|
|
|
|
||
|Malcolm A. Patterson
|-
|rowspan=2 bgcolor=whitesmoke|Inverness
||
|Joseph Clyde Nunn4,41527.80%
|
|Archie Neil Chisholm3,67323.13%
|
|
|
|
||
|Joseph Clyde Nunn
|-
||
|Roderick MacLean4,25226.78%
|
|A.L. Davis3,53922.29%
|
|
|
|
||
|Roderick MacLean
|-
|bgcolor=whitesmoke|Richmond
||
|Earl Wallace Urquhart2,63653.82%
|
|William C. Boudreau2,26246.18%
|
|
|
|
||
|Earl Wallace Urquhart
|-
|bgcolor=whitesmoke|Victoria
||
|Carleton L. MacMillan2,16256.08%
|
|Leonard Walter Jones1,69343.92%
|
|
|
|
||
|Carleton L. MacMillan
|}

References

1956
Nova Scotia
1956 in Nova Scotia
October 1956 events in Canada